The Arya Vedic Academy is a private school in Ngara, a suburb of Nairobi, Kenya. It was founded by the Arya Samaj in 1980. The school has remained at the forefront of academic excellence throughout the year teaching students discipline and respect. As part of its participation in the International Advanced Level and International General Certificate for Secondary Education, the Academy participates in the annual Pearson Edexcel final examinations which are held between May - June every year in which the senior-most class takes part. As of 2012, the Academy also offers iPrimary Examinations from Pearson Edexcel at the primary level also take part in a similar examination.

School organisation
Arya Vedic consists of a nursery, primary and secondary sections. The Nursery section follows early years curriculum from Pearson Edexcel while the primary section consists of classes 1 through to 6 (class 6 being the class that participates in the Pearson Edexcel iPrimary  examinations), while the secondary section consists of classes 7 through to 13 (Year 11, 12 and 13 being the class that participates in the secondary examinations). It follows the International Advanced Level and International General Certificate of Secondary Education curriculum in the secondary sections.

The school has a house system, where students are categorized into four houses which compete against each other in various events that are held throughout the academic year such as the annual General Quiz and the annual Sport's Day. Each house is named after a prominent figure in history. The four houses are named as follows:

 Green House is called Mandela House, in honour of former South African President Nelson Mandela
 Blue House is called Mother Teresa House, in honour of the Roman Catholic nun Mother Teresa
 Yellow House is called Marie Curie House, in honour of the famous physicist Marie Curie
 Red House is called Martin Luther House, in honour of African-American activist Martin Luther King Jr.

School location
The school is located within an urban setting in the bustling city of Nairobi. It is readily accessible from all parts of the city, and is well connected to local public transport.

References

Schools in Nairobi
Educational institutions established in 1980
Elementary and primary schools in Kenya
1980 establishments in Kenya
High schools and secondary schools in Kenya
Private schools in Kenya